Alexander Kenneth Yontz (born July 13, 1986) is an American professional stock car racing crew chief and former driver who works as a crew chief for the No. 10 Kaulig Racing Chevrolet Camaro driven by various drivers in the NASCAR Xfinity Series. He previously crew chiefed Kaulig's No. 11 car in the Xfinity Series, driven by Justin Haley and Daniel Hemric.

Racing career

Driving career

Crew chiefing career

Yontz began crew chiefing in the Xfinity Series midway through 2019 after the unexpected death of Nick Harrison, the crew chief of Kaulig Racing's No. 11 car driven by Justin Haley. He continued in that role in 2020 and 2021. When Haley moved up to Kaulig's new No. 31 car in the Cup Series in 2022, Yontz did not move up with him and he continued to crew chief the No. 11 car in the Xfinity Series, now driven by Daniel Hemric.

On September 9, 2022, it was announced that Yontz would be switching cars, moving from the No. 11 of Hemric to the No. 10 of Landon Cassill starting with the race at Kansas the next day. Both the No. 10 and No. 11 cars had struggled during the season compared to Kaulig's No. 16 car driven by A. J. Allmendinger and were close to the bottom of the playoff grid and in danger of falling out. (Even after the crew chief swap, Cassill's No. 10 car ended up missing the playoffs.) Jason Trinchere, who was the crew chief of Cassill's No. 10 car, switched cars with Yontz and became the crew chief for Hemric's No. 11 car.

Motorsports career results

NASCAR
(key) (Bold – Pole position awarded by qualifying time. Italics – Pole position earned by points standings or practice time. * – Most laps led.)

Craftsman Truck Series

ARCA Re/Max Series
(key) (Bold – Pole position awarded by qualifying time. Italics – Pole position earned by points standings or practice time. * – Most laps led.)

References

External links
 
 

1986 births
NASCAR drivers
NASCAR crew chiefs
ARCA Menards Series drivers
Living people
Racing drivers from North Carolina